Hindusthan College of Arts and Science is an autonomous private institution founded in 1998 managed by Hindustan Educational and Charitable Trust. The college is located on Avinashi Road in Coimbatore India.

References

External links

Universities and colleges in Coimbatore